Piotr Bazler (born April 13, 1981 in Łódź) is a Polish professional football player who plays for Górnik Łęczna in the Ekstraklasa.

Career
Bazler began his career in Poland, playing for ŁKS Łódź, Widzew Łódź, Ceramika Opoczno, Unia Janikowo, Drwęca Nowe Miasto Lubawskie and Arka Gdynia.

In the summer 2010, he moved to Dolcan Ząbki from Legia Warsaw.

References

External links
 

Living people
1981 births
Polish footballers
Widzew Łódź players
Ceramika Opoczno players
Arka Gdynia players
ŁKS Łódź players
Footballers from Łódź
Association football midfielders